A Guide to Keynes is a non-fiction work by Alvin Hansen, about John Maynard Keynes' work The General Theory. It was first published in 1953. Hansen's guide, 237 pages long. It explains Keynes's General Theory in a chapter-by-chapter fashion more accessible to a beginner. Alvin Hansen, once referred to as "the American Keynes", had brought the 1930s Keynesian economics revolution, along with other economists, to the United States.

References

Books about John Maynard Keynes
McGraw-Hill books